Pavel Camrda (born 3 December 1968) is a Czech former cyclist. He competed in the men's cross-country mountain biking event at the 1996 Summer Olympics.

References

External links
 

1968 births
Living people
Czech male cyclists
Olympic cyclists of the Czech Republic
Cyclists at the 1996 Summer Olympics
People from Tábor
Sportspeople from the South Bohemian Region
20th-century Czech people
21st-century Czech people